Varian (also Romanized as Vārīān, Vārīyān, and Vāryān; also known as Vāryān-e Jadīd and Āryān) is a village in Adaran Rural District, Asara District, Karaj County, Alborz Province, Iran. At the 2016 census, its population was 39, in 15 families.

Varian was originally located on the bed of the Karaj Dam. Following the dam's construction, the village was relocated to higher grounds. This made it only accessible by waterway.

References 

Populated places in Karaj County